The White Tower is a 1950 American Technicolor adventure film directed by Ted Tetzlaff and starring Alida Valli as a woman determined to fulfill her father's dream by conquering the mountain that killed her father, and Glenn Ford as the mountaineer who loves her. It is based on the 1945 novel of the same name by James Ramsey Ullman. She assembles an unusual climbing party of six people  in the Swiss Alps to tackle the nearly impossible ascent of a mountain known as 'The White Tower,' which has never been climbed. While struggling together to conquer the obstacle, each climber shows his true worth, or lack thereof.

Plot
Mountain climbers in the Swiss Alps mull over past problems while trying to conquer a perilous peak.

Cast
 Glenn Ford as Martin Ordway
 Alida Valli as Carla Alten (as Valli)
 Claude Rains as Paul DeLambre
 Oskar Homolka as Andreas (as Oscar Homolka)
 Cedric Hardwicke as Dr. Nicholas Radcliffe (as Sir Cedric Hardwicke)
 Lloyd Bridges as Hein
 June Clayworth as Mme. Astrid DeLambre
 Lotte Stein as Frau Andreas

See also
 List of American films of 1950

References

External links
 
 
 
 

1950 films
1950 adventure films
American adventure films
Films based on American novels
Films scored by Roy Webb
Films directed by Ted Tetzlaff
Films set in the Alps
Films set in Switzerland
Mountaineering films
1950s English-language films
1950s American films